Iskisyakovo (İśkesäk) is a rural locality (a village) in Kuzyanovsky Selsoviet, Ishimbaysky District, Bashkortostan, Russia. The population was 68 as of 2010. There is 1 street.

Geography 
Iskisyakovo is located 51 km east of Ishimbay (the district's administrative centre) by road. Kyzyl Oktyabr is the nearest rural locality.

References 

Rural localities in Ishimbaysky District